The 1908 West Virginia Mountaineers football team was an American football team that represented West Virginia University as an independent during the 1908 college football season. In its first season under head coach Charles Augustus Lueder, the team compiled a 5–3 record and outscored opponents by a total of 101 to 29. Mont M. McIntyre was the team captain.

Schedule

References

West Virginia
West Virginia Mountaineers football seasons
West Virginia Mountaineers football